Panstrogylus geniculatus is a blood-sucking sylvatic insect noted as a putative vector of minor importance in the transmission of Trypanosoma cruzi to humans; this is a parasite, which causes Chagas disease. The insect is described as sylvatic; subsisting primarily in humid forests, and is also known to inhabit vertebrate nesting places such as those of the armadillo (dasypus novemcinctus or dasypus), and is also involved in enzootic transmission of T. cruzi to those species. It has wide distribution throughout 16 Latin American countries.

There have been few scientific studies of this particular species because of the low number of collected specimens and difficulties in rearing and maintaining populations in the laboratory. However, currently P. geniculatus is receiving attention as a potential vector of Chagas disease (American trypanosomiasis) due to reports of this species invading the domestic and peridomestic habitats over a vast area: Venezuela, Colombia, Brazil, Peru, Ecuador, and Argentina.

P. geniculatus is apparently in the process of domiciliation, using the same strategies as highly domesticated species like Triatoma infestans and Rhodnius prolixus.  This is also the case for other sylvatic triatomine species (Triatominae) that are experiencing similar ecological pressures originating from human disruption of the natural habitat.

Prevalence in Venezuela 
A 2005 study conducted by the Universidad Central de Venezuela, used Panstrongylus specimens collected from Caracas City and the neighboring areas of Miranda and Vargas States. Through the use of a dot-ELISA test and other techniques to determine the presence of trypanosome cruzi, it was found through the examination of feces that 67 of the 88 (76.1%) specimens collected were carrying the parasite and that 53 (60.2%) of those reacted positively to human antiserum.

References

Reduviidae
Hemiptera of South America
Insects described in 1811